Emily Rosemond (born 11 March 1986 in Cairns) is an Australian short track speed skater, who represented Australia at the 2006 Winter Olympics before changing sports and representing Australia in track cycling. Rosemond was given the Keys to the City of Brisbane in 2006 after her Olympic debut at the age of 19 years.Emily Rosemond made her Olympic debut as a short track speed skater at the 2006 Torino Winter Olympics. She contested the 1000m and 1500m, finishing 12th and 25th respectively. Rosemond's short track career was interrupted by an ACL rupture, six months before her Olympic Games debut. Rosemond retired from short track speed skating in 2008 after the World Championships, and took up the sport of track cycling.

Rosemond represented Australia in Track Cycling from 2008 to 2011. She made her first Australian cycling team in the 2008/09 season where she won a Silver medal at the 2008 World Cup in Melbourne, Australia in the Team Sprint, she also won the Oceanic Games in the sprint, keirin and team sprint events before competing at the World Championships in Copenhagen in 2009. In the 2009 at the UCI Melbourne World Cup in track cycling she continued her progression winning a silver medal in the women's team sprint with her wife Kerrie Meares.  
At the 2010 Commonwealth Games in Delhi, India she advanced through to the finals of the women's sprint and won a bronze medal. She retired from track cycling in 2011 after suffering a shoulder tear.

In the 2018 Commonwealth Games in Queensland she carried the Queen's Baton in her home town Cairns and rode the derny during the Women's keirin events.

Honors

2006
Awarded Keys to the City of Brisbane, Australia
2010
AIS Honours
2018
Queens Baton Bearer Gold Coast Commonwealth Games, Cairns

Career Highlights

2005
Australian Short Track National Champion
2006
Australian Short Track National Champion
2006
12th "Den Hague", Netherlands, ISU Short Track Speed Skating World Cup
15th "Bormio, Italy" ISU Short Track Speed Skating World Cup
12th Winter Olympic Games, Torino, Italy (1000 event)
2008
1st Team Sprint Australian Track Championships NSW
2nd Keirin Australian Track Championships NSW
2nd Team Sprint 2008–09 UCI Track World Cup AUS
3rd Sprint Australian Track Championships NSW
3rd Keirin Oceania Track Championhships AUS
3rd Team Sprint Oceania Track Championships AUS
4th Sprint Oceania Track Championships AUS
8th Sprint 2008–09 UCI Track World Cup AUS
10th Keirin 2008–09 UCI Track World Cup AUS
2009
1st Team Sprint Australian Track Championships SA
2nd Keirin Australian Track Championships SA
2nd Keirin UCI Track World Cup COL
3rd Time Trial Australian Track Championships SA
3rd Team Sprint 2009–10 UCI Track World Cup AUS
4th Sprint Australian Track Championships SA
8th Keirin 2009–10 UCI Track World Cup AUS
10th Sprint 2009–10 UCI Track World Cup AUS
2010
1st Team Sprint 2011 Oceania Track Championships SA
1st Sprint 2010 Oceania Track Championships NZL
1st Team Sprint 2010 Oceania Track Championships NZL
1st Keirin 2010 Oceania Track Championships NZL
2nd Keirin 2011 Oceania Track Championships SA
2nd Time Trial 2010 Oceania Track Championships NZL
2nd Team Sprint UCI Track World Cup CHN
2nd Flying 200m Sprint Perth Winter Track Grand Prix WA
2nd Final 200m Sprint Perth Winter Track Grand Prix WA
3rd Sprint 2011 Oceania Track Championships SA
3rd Sprint Commonwealth Games IND
4th Keirin 2010/11 UCI Track World Cup – Cali Round COL
Commonwealth Games Bronze Medalist (Delhi, India)

References 

1986 births
Living people
Australian female short track speed skaters
Australian female cyclists
Australian track cyclists
Cyclists from Queensland
Olympic short track speed skaters of Australia
Short track speed skaters at the 2006 Winter Olympics
Cyclists at the 2010 Commonwealth Games
Commonwealth Games bronze medallists for Australia
Commonwealth Games medallists in cycling
Medallists at the 2010 Commonwealth Games